Benjamin Bailey may refer to:

Benjamin Franklin Bailey (1875–after 1954), American inventor of the capacitor
Benjamin Bailey (missionary) (1791–1871), British missionary in India
Benjamin H. Bailey (1823–1919), American Unitarian minister
Ben Bailey (born 1970), American game show host

See also
 Benny Bailey (1925–2005), American jazz trumpeter
 Benjamin Bayly (1671–1720), English divine
 Benjamin Bailly (born 1990), Belgian racing driver